Fortune Brands was a holding company founded in 1969 as American Brands, renamed in 1997 and split apart in 2011. The corporate headquarters was in Deerfield, Illinois, in the United States. The company had diversified product lines. It announced on December 8, 2010, that it would focus on its liquor business, and spin off or sell other parts of the company including home furnishings, hardware and golf products. The company sold its Titleist and FootJoy product lines to FILA Korea. On October 3, 2011, it split the remainder of its business into two publicly traded companies: Fortune Brands Home & Security and Beam Inc.. On January 13, 2014, Suntory (headquartered in Osaka, Japan) announced it would buy Beam Inc. for about $13.6 billion. The acquisition was completed on April 30, 2014, for about $16 billion and Beam became a subsidiary of Suntory named Beam Suntory.

History 
The American Tobacco Company was founded in 1890. In the late 1960s, with health concerns seen as posing an increasing threat to the tobacco business, management decided to diversify into other fields and changed the corporate name to American Brands, Inc. Brown & Williamson acquired the tobacco division in 1994.

Former divisions

Tobacco 
American Tobacco Company was the original division of American Brands. American Tobacco was sold to British American Tobacco in 1994.

Insurance  
American Brands acquired Franklin Life Insurance in 1979. It sold the company to American General in 1994.

ACCO 
In 1987 American Brands acquired ACCO, a holding company which owned several office supply subsidiaries. Stapler manufacturer Swingline, Inc., which American Brands had acquired in 1970, was combined with ACCO.  In 2005, the company spun off ACCO to shareholders, and immediately thereafter ACCO merged with General Binding Corporation.  This merged company is now known as ACCO Brands.

Golf 
The Acushnet Company, purchased in 1976, became American Brands' golf division. It produced golf balls, shoes, and clubs under the  Pinnacle Golf, Titleist, FootJoy and Cobra Golf trademarks. The Acushnet Rubber division, which was Acushnet's original business, was sold off in 1985. Cobra Golf was sold to Puma AG in March 2010, and the other golf brands were sold to Fila in 2011.

Home and hardware 

The home and hardware division reached annual sales of over $4 billion, from Waterloo Industries, Masterbrand Cabinets (and its subsidiaries), Moen faucets, Fypon, Therma-Tru doors, Simonton windows, Master Lock, American Lock, and Vista Window Company, Western Division. Many of these operations passed to Fortune Brands Home & Security when the company was split.

Spirits 
Fortune Brands had a stable of well known spirits brands, led by Jim Beam, which it had purchased in 1968.

In July 2005, Fortune Brands and French spirits company Pernod Ricard acquired over 25 additional spirits and wine brands from British holding company Allied Domecq.  
In November 2007, Constellation Brands announced a purchase of Fortune Brands' wine operations for $885 million USD, a transaction that added  of vineyards, several major brands such as Clos du Bois, and 2.6 million cases per year of "super-premium" class wine production.

After the other product lines were sold and spun off, the remaining spirits business became Beam Inc.

References 

 
Conglomerate companies of the United States
Holding companies of the United States
Distilleries in Illinois
Defunct companies based in Illinois
American companies established in 1969
Conglomerate companies established in 1969
American companies disestablished in 2011
Holding companies disestablished in 2011
1969 establishments in Illinois
2011 disestablishments in Illinois